Maithree Wickremesinghe  (born 11 August 1964) is the current First Lady of Sri Lanka as the wife of President Ranil Wickremesinghe. She is a Sri Lankan academic, writer, and professor of English at the University of Kelaniya. She specializes in gender and women's studies. 

Wickremesinghe is the founding director of the Centre for Gender Studies at the University of Kelaniya and a visiting professor on gender and women's studies at other educational institutions including the University of Colombo and University of Sussex. She has focused on gender equity and equality policy strategies, conducting gender sensitization trainings, and evaluating women’s and gender programs for local and international organizations for more than 25 years.

Family and education
The only child of Senevi B. Wickremasinghe and Shiranee Wickremasinghe (née Bandaratilaka) of Nawala, Koswatte, she attended Musaeus College, a private girl's school in Colombo. She graduated from King's College London with a BA (Hons) degree in English and went on to complete her MA degree in Women’s Studies at the University of Colombo. She had gained her Ph.D. degree from the Institute of Education, University of London, specializing in feminist research methodology in Sri Lanka. In 1994, she married Ranil Wickremesinghe. In July 2022 she became the First Lady of Sri Lanka when Ranil became the President of Sri Lanka. She is the first Presidential spouse with a Ph.D in Sri Lanka.

Aacademia
Maithree Wickremesinghe has delivered keynotes and addressed plenaries at academic and professional fora in Spain, Kenya, India, Pakistan, South Korea, China and United States of America.

Selected publications
From Theory to Action – Women, Gender and Development (2000), published by Friedrich Ebert Steiftung.
ITDG (Practical Action) book Gender Dimensions in Disaster Management (2003/2005), co-authored (with Madhavi Malalgoda Ariyabandhu)
 Beyond Glass Ceilings and Brick Walls – Gender at the Workplace, co-authored with Wijaya Jayatilake and published by the International Labor Organization (2006).
" Feminist Research Methodology – Making Meaning of Meaning Making (2010) published by Rutledge.
" Towards Gender Equity / Equality: A Scan of gender Sensitive Laws, Policies and Programmes in Sri Lanka (2012) published by ILO.

References

External links
Maithree Wickramasinghe at University of Kelaniya
 

1964 births
Living people
People from Colombo
Spouses of national leaders
First ladies and gentlemen of Sri Lanka
People from British Ceylon
Sri Lankan Buddhists
Sri Lankan feminists
Sri Lankan women academics
Sinhalese academics
Academic staff of the University of Kelaniya
Alumni of King's College London
Alumni of the University of Colombo
Alumni of the UCL Institute of Education
Alumni of Musaeus College
Maitree
Ranil Wickremesinghe
20th-century Sri Lankan women
21st-century Sri Lankan women